In measure theory, a radonifying function (ultimately named after Johann Radon) between measurable spaces is one that takes a cylinder set measure (CSM) on the first space to a true measure on the second space. It acquired its name because the pushforward measure on the second space was historically thought of as a Radon measure.

Definition

for each , where  is the usual push forward of the measure  by the linear map .

Push forward of a CSM
Because the definition of a CSM on  requires that the maps in  be surjective, the definition of the push forward for a CSM requires careful attention. The CSM

is defined by

if the composition  is surjective.
,
where  (so ) is such that .

See also

References

Banach spaces
Measure theory
Types of functions